List of electrical characteristics of single collision domain segment "slow speed" network buses:

The number of nodes can be limited by either number of available addresses or bus capacitance. None of the above use any analog domain modulation techniques like MLT-3 encoding, PAM-5 etc.

PSI5 designed with automation applications in mind is a bit unusual in that it uses Manchester code.

See also 
 Multidrop bus
 Characteristic impedance
 Category 5 cable
 Telegrapher's equations
 Single-ended signaling
 Network segment
 CEBus
 KNX (EIB)

References

External links 
 bipom.com - Micro interfacing.pdf

Computer networks
Serial buses